Michael Scott (born 23 September 1954) is an English former professional rugby league footballer who played in the 1970s, 1980s and 1990s.

Background
Mick Scott was born in Halifax, West Riding of Yorkshire, England.

Playing career

Challenge Cup Final appearances
Mick Scott played right- in Halifax's 19–18 victory over St. Helens in the 1987 Challenge Cup Final during the 1986–87 season at Wembley Stadium, London on Saturday 2 May 1987, and played as an interchange/substitute (replacing  Les Holliday) in the 32–12 defeat by Wigan in the 1988 Challenge Cup Final during the 1987–88 season at Wembley Stadium, London on Saturday 30 April 1988.

County Cup Final appearances
Mick Scott played left- in Halifax's 6–15 defeat by Leeds in the 1979 Yorkshire Cup Final during the 1979–80 season at Headingley, Leeds on Saturday 27 October 1979.

John Player Trophy Final appearances
Mick Scott played right- in Wigan's 15–4 victory over Leeds in the 1982–83 John Player Trophy Final during the 1982–83 season at Elland Road, Leeds on Saturday 22 January 1983, and played as an interchange/substitute, (replacing interchange/substitute Steve Smith) in Halifax's 12–24 defeat by Wigan in the 1989–90 Regal Trophy Final during the 1989–90 season at Headingley, Leeds on Saturday 13 January 1990.

Championship winner
Mick Scott was re-signed from Wigan by Halifax in July 1985 for a transfer fee of £10,000 (based on increases in average earnings, this would be approximately £41,190 in 2014). He played in 32 games in all competitions in the 1985–86 season as Halifax pipped Wigan to the Championship by 1 point.

Honoured at Halifax
Mick Scott is a Halifax Hall of Fame Inductee.

References

External links
Statistics at wigan.rlfans.com

1954 births
Living people
English rugby league players
Halifax R.L.F.C. players
Rugby league locks
Rugby league players from Halifax, West Yorkshire
Rugby league second-rows
Wigan Warriors players